KBX may refer to:

kbx, ISO 639-3 language code for Kambot language
KBX, a Library of Congress Classification
Kirby Cross railway station, UK national rail code KBX
Karachi Bunder And Sidings railway station, Pakistan station code KBX
PH-KBX, aircraft registration of Dutch royal family